The American Gas Association (AGA) is an American trade organization founded in 1918 representing and advocating on behalf of local energy companies that deliver natural gas throughout the United States.

History
The American Gas Association was formed in June 1918 after the merger of the American Gas Institute and the National Commercial Gas Association, organizations that served the interests of companies that dealt in manufactured, as opposed to natural gas.  Manufactured gas was the dominant fuel in the early United States, but during the 19th century, natural gas supplanted it.

In January 1919, the AGA launched a publication for the natural gas industry providing information on trends, activities, and strategies on how to improve gas companies.

In 1925, the association formed laboratories in Cleveland, and five years later expanded to Los Angeles. These labs developed technology to improve gas appliances and equipment, making them more energy-efficient and consumer-friendly.  The labs also did testing to ensure gas equipment conformed to national standards for safety, durability, and performance. The AGA ended its laboratory activities in 1997 and the new CSA International took its place.  CSA today still runs a U.S. certification-type program from the AGA's original Cleveland laboratory.

In 1927, the AGA merged with the National Gas Association to help the AGA's member companies which depended on manufactured gas to make a smooth transition to natural gas.

In 1935, Congress passed the Public Utility Act and broke up the holding company that dominated much of the country's utility industry; this law continued to be enforced until 2005.

During the 1930s, the AGA formed the National Advertising Committee to oversee a nationwide advertising program promoting gas for cooking, water heating, refrigeration, and house heating.

The Honorable Karen Alderman Harbert became the association's President and CEO on April 1, 2019. She is a former federal government official and leader of energy industry organizations.  She replaces Dave McCurdy who retired from the association on February 28, 2019.

Lobbying Work
Since at least 1990, but possibly earlier, the organization has registered as a lobbyist to discuss issues issues pertaining to the natural gas industry with elected officials of the government. AGA President and CEO Karen Harbert and independent lobbyist George Lowe are considered among the most powerful government lobbyists in Washington DC. in 2014 Lowe was named as vice president of federal affairs for the organization. He previously served as a senior staff member for two Alaskan senators, Lisa Murkowski and Ted Stevens.

As an advocacy group for gas suppliers, the AGA created a social media campaign called "Cooking With Gas" featuring online influencer Amber Kelly. The campaign's goal was to illustrate the benefits of natural gas to younger consumers. In addition, the organization has fought to pass state laws barring local governments from restricting gas use in new buildings. According to an investigation by National Public Radio, "state laws became a priority for the gas association at least as far back as December 2019." As of 2021, four U.S. states have passed bills ensuring that gas service can be provided to new structures.

The American Gas Association has also worked with the (FERC) Federal Energy Regulatory Commission to improve market transparency reporting. In 2004, the FERC issued a policy statement on price reporting and price index publishing.  The following year, the Energy Policy Act of 2005 included market behavior and provisions and penalties, and FERC issued a rule prohibiting market manipulation.

The AGA co-launched what is known as the Natural Gas Sustainability Initiative (NGSI) with the investor-owned utility company trade association Edison Electric Institute (EEI). The two groups launched the pilot for the NGSI in 2017, and then released "version two" in August 2019. The NGSI is an agreement by electric utilities and natural gas companies to use a special template to report efforts in the areas of environmental, social, governance, and sustainability ("ESG/sustainability") to the financial sector. Both the AGA and EEI expect that most of their member companies will be using the NGSI reporting template by the end of 2019. The reporting template provides both quantitative data and qualitative information.

Issues
The American Gas Association has faced financial issues regarding the taxation of dividends. In 2002, The American Gas Association's main priority was to eliminate double taxation on dividends. AGA analyst Charlie Fritts voiced his opinions about the opposition of double taxation due to the possible effects it can have on gas companies. The United States tax code has also been seen as problematic by the American Gas Association, as according to the AGA it creates an uneven playing field for companies that pay dividends and gas companies that maintain most of their earnings. Fritts had also viewed double taxation as problematic because the gas utility industry is expected to raise approximately $100 billion in capital in the following 20 years after 2002, which can be hampered if profits (dividends) from investments are highly taxed. The main goal was to develop a natural gas infrastructure in the United States. Fritts also stated that "natural gas demand is expected to grow 50 percent between 2003 until 2020; utilities must raise substantial capital to build 255,000 miles of natural gas distribution pipe to meet that demand."

The United States has enough domestic natural gas to meet demands for several industries for several decades into the future, according to the Potential Gas Committee (PGC). The committee is a nonprofit industry-funded organization. "Specifically, the United States possesses a technically recoverable natural gas resource base of 2,817 trillion cubic feet (Tcf) yet to be discovered, said Alexei V. Milkov, a professor and director of the PGC at the Colorado School of Mines, which provides guidance and technical assistance to the PGC." Milkov Later clarified that "that’s jargon for 'the U.S. has abundant resources of natural gas.’"

At an Edison Electric Institute (EEI) meeting of U.S. investor-owned utility company executives in November 2019, the American Gas Association and EEI announced a new initiative for energy companies to measure and disclose methane emissions from their natural gas suppliers.

In September 2011, Dave McCurdy the President and CEO of the American Gas Association has expressed optimism towards the growth of energy sources in the near future.   AGA's President argues how the United States current energy policy is divorced from the economic reality that natural gas has a good chance of competing in the marketplace if the United States is willing  to navigate away from dependence on foreign oil.  McCurdy has remained optimistic by speculating that consumer demand will increase during the next few years.

McCurdy suggests that one of the main economic issues in the United States concerns its addiction to foreign oil.  The President of the American Gas Association has developed a few proposals to reduce carbon emissions that contribute to global warming.  McCurdy mentions how the discovery of natural gas in the Marcellus State region  from upstate New York to Kentucky can transform into a future foundation site for American energy. The AGA President presented the idea that switching millions of tractor trailers  to natural gas would have played a substantial role not only in reducing the amount of foreign oil consumed by America but would ultimately reduce the production carbon emissions which contributes to global warming.

McCurdy also argues drilling in some Marcellus states have had revitalized dying towns while keeping the unemployment rate below the national average.  McCurdy has been criticized for his proposal requiring the acquisition of natural gas because of the possibility of hydraulic fracturing leading to polluted water supplies.  Despite, the long-term issues of McCurdy's proposals, at the state level the short-term benefits are replaced by the realization that natural gas is not only an alternative solution to foreign oil but can also contribute to the creation of thousands of jobs.  The AGA President also explains methods on how to meet the Obama administration's goal of the development electric vehicles by 2025 by suggesting that the U.S. capital on natural gas and the development of infrastructure investments. While the American Gas Association believes that natural gas is considered a necessity in the United States they also believe that the fuel-economy requirements of the country cannot be meet without the production of natural gas.

References

External links 

True Blue Natural Gas -- American Gas Association blog

Organizations established in 1918
Natural gas in the United States
Organizations based in Washington, D.C.
Energy organizations